The Tranys is a river of  Kėdainiai district municipality, Kaunas County, central Lithuania.

The river is a left tributary of the Smilga, which flows into the Neman via the Nevėžis. Its basin is mostly covered by forests (the Krakės-Dotnuva forest and Josvainiai forest).

The Tranys passes through Špitolpievis and Patranys villages.

The name Tranys possibly comes from Lithuanian verbs tranėti, trenėti, trūnyti ('to rot, to putrefy, to decay').

References

Rivers of Lithuania
Kėdainiai District Municipality